Pierre-Hugues Herbert and Nicolas Renavand defended their title by defeating David Škoch and Simone Vagnozzi 7–5, 6–3 in the final.

Seeds

Draw

Draw

References
 Main draw

Doubles